Thierry Dubois is a French sailor born on February 24, 1967, in Saint-Germain-en-Laye. He competed in high-level offshore solo races, including two unsuccessful attempts to complete the Vendee Globe in 1996 and 2000.

In the 1996–1997 race, he and fellow competitor Tony Bullimore were dramatically rescued by the Australian Navy. They first dropped Dubois a liferaft from an aircraft before sending in a helicopter to rescue him deep into the southern ocean.

Dubois came back in 2000 but electrical issues forced him to retire in New Zealand.

After this round-the-world trip, he stopped sailing, devoting himself to IMOCA and the construction of a schooner for navigation in the Arctic seas and to link his two passions the mountain and the sea. It was launched in 2010 and Thierry Dubois now offers his clients to sail with him in Greenland or Iceland on La Louise.

References

1967 births
Living people
People from Saint-Germain-en-Laye
French male sailors (sport)
Sportspeople from Saint-Germain-en-Laye
IMOCA 60 class sailors
French Vendee Globe sailors
1996 Vendee Globe sailors
2000 Vendee Globe sailors
20th-century French people